The version history of AutoCAD, a commercial computer-aided design (CAD) and drafting software application by Autodesk, began with the release of version 1.0 in December 1982. The software has been continuously updated since its initial release.

AutoCAD opens documents having a DWG version which matches the version of AutoCAD being used or any prior DWG version.

History
The following table summarizes the version history of the AutoCAD software application.

References 

Software version histories